Eodictyonella is a genus of brachiopod. Very similar, and once proposed as synonymous with, Eichwaldia Billings 1858.

Also resembles Isogramma.

References

Brachiopod genera